NEE-02 Krysaor is an Ecuadorian technology demonstration satellite, and Ecuador's second satellite launched to space. Built by the Ecuadorian Civilian Space Agency (EXA), it is a single-unit CubeSat nanosatellite. Krysaor is a Pegasus-class spacecraft, a "twin" of Ecuador's first satellite, NEE-01 Pegaso. Like Pegaso, this spacecraft's instruments include a dual visible and infrared camera which allows the spacecraft to take pictures and transmit live video from space.

See also 

List of CubeSats

References

External links 
 Krysaor official website
 Krysaor official website

CubeSats
Science and technology in Ecuador
Spacecraft launched in 2013
2013 in Ecuador
Spacecraft launched by Dnepr rockets